carsales.com Ltd is an ASX 100 business in digital marketplaces across Oceania, Asia and The Americas.

carsales was recognised by Forbes as one of the most innovative growth companies in 2017.

History
carsales.com Ltd (carsales) was founded by Greg Roebuck and Wal Pisciotta in Melbourne, Australia in 1997 with what was at the time just a small idea of moving print classified advertisements for motor vehicles onto the internet.

In 2009, carsales listed on the ASX Stock Exchange.

In March 2017, Greg Roebuck stood down from his role as CEO and was replaced by Cameron McIntyre.

Acquisitions 

 2005 acquisition of online classified business PBL Media websites owned ACP Magazines Limited (Carpoint.com.au, Boatpoint.com.au, Bikepoint.com.au and Ihub.com.au) along with research and statistic company Equipment Research Group Pty Ltd (ERG). In return ACP would take up a 41 per cent stake in carsales.
 2007 acquisition of RedBook Australia and Asia
 2010 acquisition of Quicksales 
 2013 acquisition of 30% stake in webmotors (Brazil)
 2014 acquisition of 49.9% stake in SK Encar (Korea)
 2016 acquisition of 64% of soloautos (Mexico) and 83% of chileautos (Chile)
 2017 acquisition of SK Encar for $244 million (after previously having purchased 49.9% for $126 million in April 2014)
 2021 acquisition of 49% stake in non-auto marketplace group Trader Interactive (US)  and digital tyre wholesaler tyreconnect
 2022 acquisition of remaining stake in Trader Interactive (US)

 Sold the Homesales brand and service to BMT Tax Depreciation

Partnerships 
Australian Formula 1 driver Daniel Ricciardo is currently the carsales’ Global Brand Ambassador, a partnership since 2017.

carsales is also the major partner of the Melbourne Renegades Big Bash and Women's Big Bash League teams.

In 2015 carsales became the naming rights sponsor of Todd Kelly's Nissan Altima Supercar in the Australia Supercar Championship. This relationship continued until the end of the 2017 season.

Accreditation 
 since 2018 Great Place to Work certified 
 since 2014 workplace Gender Equality Agency (WGEA) Employer of Choice and certified Breastfeeding Friendly Workplace 
 since 2019 Australian Association of Graduate Employers (AAGE) Top Graduate Employer 
 Family Inclusive Workplace 
 Named on the 2022 AAGE Top Intern Programs list, placing 5th across all of Australia 
  certified carbon neutral under the Australian Government’s carbon-neutral certification program Climate Active

Technology 
The company has been industry recognised for its AI projects, specifically its photo recognition tool cyclops.

The technical stack of the company, including hosting in AWS, has helped it expand into new countries: "[W]ith the microservices architecture - written predominantly in .NET with interaction provided by the RabbitMQ open source messaging system - now bedded down, Carsales has for the first time been able to expand its full platform into new markets.”

In 2018 carsales.com partnered with CHEProximity to create one of a kind car commercials for private sellers on its website. This campaign was recognised within the marketing industry for its technical execution and impact.

References

External links
 carsales website

Online marketplaces of Australia
Companies based in Melbourne
Companies listed on the Australian Securities Exchange
Retail companies established in 1997
Internet properties established in 1997
1997 establishments in Australia
Auto dealerships of Australia